Malicheh may refer to:
 Malicheh, Fars
 Malicheh, Mamasani, Fars Province
 Malicheh, Malayer, Hamadan Province
 Malicheh, Tuyserkan, Hamadan Province
 Malicheh, Lorestan